John Anthony Coughlan (6 November 1934 – 2 June 1991) was an Australian politician in Tasmania.

He was born in the Melbourne suburb of Chelsea. In 1975 he was elected to the Tasmanian House of Assembly as a Labor member for Braddon in a recount following Lloyd Costello's resignation. He was Chair of Committees from 1977 to 1979 and a minister from 1977 to 1980. In 1986 he was defeated.

References

1934 births
1991 deaths
Members of the Tasmanian House of Assembly
Australian Labor Party members of the Parliament of Tasmania
20th-century Australian politicians